East–West University is a private university in Chicago, Illinois. The university was founded in 1980.  It offers associate and bachelor's degrees. The university has been accredited by the Higher Learning Commission since 1983.

Buildings
The university is housed in three buildings connected by bridges.  
The East Building at 816 S. Michigan was the original home of the university when it opened on September 5, 1980. It currently houses the mathematics and science departments.
The Loftrium Building, also known as the West Building, at 819 S. Wabash Avenue was acquired in 1999. This is where the majority of the English and Business course are conducted.
In 2014 the university opened its Student Life Center at 829 S. Wabash, which connects to the Loftrium. The 17-story building was designed by the firm of Holabird & Root and includes an auditorium, gym and dormitory space for 220 students.

Media 
Beginning in 2016, East West began publishing its own student newspaper The Phantom Press, which has published quarterly since its inception. The paper is made up of writing submissions from students and alumni, highlights of events in the surrounding area, tips for adjusting to campus life and profile pieces on various faculty members.

Athletics

At present, East-West offers an intercollegiate basketball team known as the East West Phantoms. They are coached by Tommie Posley.
EWU is a member of the United States Collegiate Athletic Association (USCAA) and competes as an independent outside of an athletic conference. In addition to other USCAA teams, the Phantoms routinely play NCAA and NAIA competition.

Student loan debt
According to a non-comprehensive survey, in December 2014, East–West University had the second lowest average student loan debt per graduate in the United States. Only one American university was ranked above it, City University of New York.

Economic and gender diversity
East–West University's median family income of a student is $24,200 in 2017.

In 2016, the student body and gender ratio was as follows:
 Women 54.0%
 Men 46.0%
 Total number of Undergraduate Students - 419

References

External links

The Phantom Press student newspaper

Universities and colleges in Chicago
Educational institutions established in 1980
Liberal arts colleges in Illinois
Private universities and colleges in Illinois